The Battle of Rohilla was a 1621 campaign by the Mughal Empire against the growing influence of the Sikhs. Because of historic persecution from the Mughal Empire and the martyrdom of the fifth Guru of the Sikhs, Guru Arjan (Also Guru Hargobind's father) on the orders of Jahangir, 

After Martyrdom of Guru Arjan Dev, Guru Hargobind fully militarised the Sikhs into a proper militia mostly based on an irregular cavalry style of warfare. This resulted in increased political and military power in the region leading to fears of usurpation by local feudal lords (jagirdars) like Bhagwan Das Ghererh who were relative of Chandu Shah (Chandu who had a key role in martyrdom of Guru Arjan). The immediate cause of the battle was the creation of the town Hargobindpur also known as Rohilla in those times and the beheading of Bhagwan Das Ghererh by Sikhs as Bhagwan Das had spoken ill words about Guru Hargobind and despite the Guru telling the Sikhs to ignore his words, the Sikhs couldn't tolerate the blasphemous nature of Chandu's descendant Bhagwan Das Ghererh. Thus the Sikhs were attacked by a group of local jagirdars such as Rattan Chand and Karam Chand who were sons of Chandu Shah under the command of the Mughal Governor of Jalandhar, Abdul Khan. The Sikhs were attacked as the Guru was rebuilding the town Hargobindpur after Guru Arjan's martyrdom which was left in ruins by the Mughals. The attacking forces were immediately repulsed and the surviving portions of the Mughal Army fled the field of battle resulting in a decisive Sikh victory.

A subsequent campaign against the continually growing influence of the Sikhs saw 4,000-15,000 Mughal troops sent to northern Punjab to support local Governor Abdul Khan against Guru Hargobind following his sound defeat in the initial skirmish. Although the Sikh General Bhai Jattu was killed in heavy fighting northeast of Amritsar at Rohilla, Ratan Chand, Karam Chand, Abdul Khan were ultimately defeated and killed, along with Abdul's sons Nabi Bakhsh and Karim Bakhsh, greatly enhancing the Sikh cause.

References

Rohilla
Rohilla
1621 in India
Rohilla